Reinhardsbrunn was a Verwaltungsgemeinschaft ("collective municipality") in the district of Gotha, in Thuringia, Germany. The seat of the Verwaltungsgemeinschaft was in Friedrichroda. It consisted of the following municipalities:

Ernstroda
Finsterbergen 
Friedrichroda

The Verwaltungsgemeinschaft was disbanded on 1 December 2007. The municipalities Ernstroda and Finsterbergen were incorporated by Friedrichroda.

Former Verwaltungsgemeinschaften in Thuringia